Weapon in Mind is the sixth studio album by Norwegian singer-songwriter Maria Mena. All songs are written by Mena, and composed by Mena and Mats Lie Skåre, Thomas Eriksen and Martin Sjølie, which are listed in the track list. The first single "Fuck You" was released on March 18, 2013. The second single "I Always Liked That" was released on June 21, 2013.

Track listing

Singles
 "Fuck You" (2013)
 "I Always Liked That" (2013)
 "All The Love" (2013)

Charts

References

Maria Mena albums
2013 albums